Palestinians in Chile are believed to be the largest Palestinian community outside of the Arab world. Estimates of the number of Palestinian descendants in Chile range from 450,000 to 500,000.

Migration history

The earliest Palestinian migrants came in the 1850s during the Crimean War, fleeing due to Russia's intent to capture and control the Holy Land. They worked mainly as businessmen and also in agriculture. Other migrants arrived before and during World War I and later the 1948 Palestine war. By origin they primarily came from the cities of Beit Jala, Bethlehem, and Beit Sahour. Most of these early migrants were Christians. They typically landed at Argentine ports, and crossed the Andes by mule into Chile. Chilean Palestinians are often erroneously but also intentionally called turcos (Spanish for Turks) after the Ottoman nationality that early immigrants had on their passports. Contrary to the immigration of Germans and other European nationalities, the immigration of Palestinians was not considered beneficial by Chilean intellectuals, and was even, alongside Chinese and Japanese immigration, questioned. The arrival of the Palestinian immigrants to Chile in the early 20th century happened at the same time the Chilean state stopped sponsoring immigration to Chile and the country suffered a severe social and economic crisis coupled with a wave of nationalism with xenophobic and racist undertones. Immigrants were also at times treated in highly denigrating terms by the Chilean press; for example, El Mercurio wrote in 1911:

Many of the immigrants were very poor and illiterate and had to take loans to pay their travel costs. Once in Chile, Palestinians settled largely in the marginal areas of cities and worked as small merchants. In the 1950s by the time of the second government of Carlos Ibáñez del Campo many Palestinian-Chileans had acquired substantial economic as well as political power in Chile, some working as deputies, ministers or ambassadors.  

Aside from these migrants of previous decades, Chile has also taken in some Palestinian refugees in later years, as in April 2008 when it received 117 from the Al-Waleed refugee camp on the Syria–Iraq border near the Al-Tanf crossing. All of those refugees were Sunni Muslims.

People who hold a Diplomatic or Official Palestinian Passport can visit Chile as tourists for up to 90 days, without a Visa.

Religion
The vast majority of the Palestinian community in Chile follow Christianity. The largest denomination is Orthodox Christian followed by Roman Catholic, and in fact, the number of Palestinian Christians in the diaspora in Chile alone exceeds the number of those who have remained in their homeland. One early Palestinian church in Santiago, the Iglesia Ortodoxa San Jorge, was founded in 1917. Some Palestinians in Chile are Sunni Muslims.

Community organisations
The Club Palestino is one of the most prestigious social clubs in Santiago; it offers swimming, tennis, and dining facilities to its members. There is also a soccer team, C.D. Palestino, whose uniform is in the traditional Palestinian colours red, green, and white. The team has been champion of the Chilean Primera División twice. Also, some Chilean-Palestinian footballers like Roberto Bishara and Alexis Norambuena have played for the Palestine national football team. Other Chileans of Palestinian origin, such as Luis Antonio Jiménez, played international football for Chile and several foreign clubs.

A number of Palestinians in Chile have shown significant concern with the situation of Palestine, for example, the president of the Cámara de Comercio (chamber of commerce) of the Barrio Patronato, himself a Palestinian, in 2006 organised a protest regarding the 2006 Lebanon War; Lebanese and Palestinian flags were widely seen in the neighbourhood's streets at that time. On another occasion, outside the Club Palestino and again in front of the Colegio Árabe, someone wrote on the sidewalk "Árabe=terrorismo" ("Arabs=terrorism") and "Palestina no existe" ("Palestine does not exist").

In literature
A number of Chilean novels have featured Palestinian characters and discussed the experience of Palestinian immigrants in the country, such as El viajero de la alfombra mágica by Walter Garib, Los turcos by Roberto Sarah, and Peregrino de ojos brillantes, by Jaime Hales.

Notable people

See also
Arab Chileans
Lebanese Chileans
Immigration to Chile

References

Notes

Sources

External links
Escritores chilenos de origen arabe
Fundación Palestina Belén 2000-Chile
Federación Palestina de Chile
Unión General de Estudiantes Palestinos de Chile
Comerciante palestino en Patronato, an article from the Corporación del Patrimonio Cultural de Chile

Arab Chilean
Ethnic groups in Chile
 
Palestinian diaspora in South America